Joan Fitzalan or (FitzAlan) may refer to:
 Joan Fitzalan, Countess of Hereford, Countess of Essex and Countess of Northampton (1347/1348–1419); daughter of Richard FitzAlan, 10th Earl of Arundel and Eleanor of Lancaster
 Joan Fitzalan (c. 1360 – 1404); daughter of John FitzAlan, 1st Baron Arundel; granddaughter of Richard Fitzalan, 10th Earl of Arundel and Eleanor of Lancaster 
 Joan FitzAlan, Baroness Bergavenny (1375–1435); daughter of Richard Fitzalan, 11th Earl of Arundel and Elizabeth de Bohun.